9 September 1944 is a date.

9 September 1944 may also refer to:

 1944 Bulgarian coup d'état, which occurred on 9 September 1944
 Order of 9 September 1944, a Bulgarian order awarded from 1945 to 1990

See also
 "9 IX 1944", the motto on the emblem of the People's Republic of Bulgaria from 1947 to 1971